Dipeptidase 3 (DPEP3) is a protein that in humans is encoded by the DPEP3 gene.

This gene encodes a membrane-bound glycoprotein from the family of dipeptidases (EC 3.4.13.19) involved in hydrolytic metabolism of various dipeptides, including penem and carbapenem beta-lactam antibiotics. This gene is located on chromosome 16 in a cluster with another member of this family, DPEP2. Alternatively spliced transcript variants that encode different isoforms have been found for this gene.

References

Further reading

EC 3.4.13